() is Japan's largest chain of used bookstores. Founded in August 1991, the company has had explosive success, expanding to 866 stores throughout Japan and eight overseas locations (as of August 2006). In addition to books, its chains also sell manga, CDs, DVDs, video games, and even used video game consoles, mobile phones and portable media players. The stores are distinguished by their large surface area, cleanliness and bright illumination.

Operations 

Book Off stores are large and browsing is encouraged. Another innovation cited for its success is the practice of shaving the edges off the pages of books using a special machine in order to make them appear newer. By offering a wide selection of books that appear like new at reduced prices, Book Off has aggressively targeted conventional bookstore chains, which since 1953 have been unable to discount new and near-new books and other media due to government regulations which enable a publisher's cartel.

Book Off is frequently cited as a rare example of a corporation that was able to grow during the so-called "lost decade" of economic stagnation that followed the collapse of the Japanese asset price bubble, through its use of innovative business strategies. It expanded from merely used books to used second-hand merchandise through its Hard Off stores, and to the video rental market through Tsutaya.

International stores

Book Off also operates several stores in the United States, two in Seoul and three in Paris. In 2012, it closed its only Canadian store in Vancouver, British Columbia. In the USA, there are two stores in New York, seven in California, and two in Hawaii. There are eight stores in Malaysia operating under the Jalan Jalan Japan brand.

Gallery

References

External links 

 
 U.S. website

Bookstores of Japan
Companies based in Kanagawa Prefecture
Retail companies established in 1991
Japanese companies established in 1991